Johnny Moses is a Tulalip Native American master storyteller, oral historian, healer and spiritual leader.

Background

Moses was raised on Vancouver Island, British Columbia, Canada in the village of Ohiat. He learned tribal traditions from his grandparents and has the traditional name Whis.stem.men.knee (Walking Medicine Robe).

In addition to speaking English, Moses is fluent in eight native languages and can also tell stories in traditional sign language.

Moses has published several story-telling books including The Medicine Clothes That Look at the People in August, 2020.

References

External links
 Official website

Living people
Year of birth missing (living people)
Tulalip Tribes
21st-century Native Americans